The Zeiss Touit 1.8/32 is an interchangeable camera lens announced by Zeiss on September 18, 2012.

References
http://www.dpreview.com/products/zeiss/lenses/zeiss_touit_32_1p8/specifications

Camera lenses introduced in 2012
Touit 1.8 32
X-mount lenses